"Every Time I Look at You" is a song by the American rock band Kiss from their 1992 studio album Revenge. It became the album's final single.

Background and writing 
It was the ninth track on the band's 1992 studio album Revenge.

The song was written by Paul Stanley and Bob Ezrin,

Composition 
Brett Weiss' Encyclopedia of KISS notes that the song "Every Time I Look at You" "is further proof" to the fact that "with songs like 'Beth' and 'Forever' KISS can do powerballads with the best of them."

According to the same Encyclopedia of KISS, Dick Wagner, a "prolific musician", "who worked with such legendary acts as Lou Reed and Billy Joel, plays guitar on the song. It wasn't the first and only time he played on a Kiss recording, among other Kiss songs he played guitar on were "Beth", "Flaming Youth" and "Sweet Pain" (from the 1976 album Destroyer).

Personnel
Paul Stanley – lead and backing vocals, 12-string acoustic guitar
Bruce Kulick – electric guitar, bass 
Eric Singer – drums, percussion 

with
Dick Wagner – guitar solo
Bob Ezrin – keyboards, strings & horn arrangement

Charts

References

External links 
 "Every Time I Look at You" at Discogs

1990s ballads
1992 songs
1992 singles
Kiss (band) songs
Mercury Records singles
Songs written by Paul Stanley
Songs written by Bob Ezrin
Glam metal ballads